Tetracladium may refer to:
 Tetracladium (fungus), a genus of funguses in the family Helotiaceae
 Tetracladium (trematode), a genus of trematodes in the family Heterophyidae
 Tetracladium (moss), a genus of moss in the family Thuidiaceae